Alexia Kalantaridou (born January 19, 1995, in Katerini, Greece) is a female professional volleyball player from Greece, who is a member of the Greece women's national volleyball team. At club level, she plays in Hellenic Volley League for Greek powerhouse Olympiacos Piraeus since July 2019.

Sporting achievements

Clubs

National championships
 2017/2018  Hellenic Championship, with A.O. Thira
 2018/2019  Hellenic Championship, with A.O. Thira

National trophies
 2018/2019  Hellenic Cup, with A.O. Thira

Individuals
 2015-16 Hellenic Championship: Rookie of the season

References

External links
 Alexia Kalantaridou: profile, achievements, team career at women.volleybox.net
 Alexia Kalantaridou: profile at greekvolley.eu 
 2020 Olympiacos Women's Volleyball team roster at CEV web site
 profile at cev.eu

1995 births
Living people
Olympiacos Women's Volleyball players
Greek women's volleyball players
Sportspeople from Katerini
21st-century Greek women